Carpenter Rocks is a town and locality located  south-west of Mount Gambier in the south-east of South Australia. The area faces the Southern Ocean and is renowned for its rugged coastline which provides exceptional fishing and diving locations.

Carpenter Rocks is in the District Council of Grant local government area, the South Australian House of Assembly electoral district of Mount Gambier and the Australian House of Representatives Division of Barker.

History and settlement 
The earliest people in the Carpenter Rocks area were the aboriginal communities from the Booandik tribe. They were scattered in small groups along the coast where they had access to an abundance of food and water. Due to disease and land dispossession the last full-blooded Booandik died in 1904.

Lieutenant James Grant, when on board , was the first known British person to view land known today as south eastern South Australia. On 3 December 1800, he sighted what at first he thought was four unconnected islands, but on a closer look realized they were two mountains and two capes. One of these he named Cape Banks, just west of today's township, after English Botanist - Joseph Banks. On 4 April 1802, the French explorer Nicholas Baudin aboard the ship Geographe noticed the area and made the observation: 

According to Geoffrey Manning and Rodney Cockburn in "Place Names of South Australia", "The Rocks" were named "Les Carpentiers" ("The Carpenters") by Nicholas Baudin because their indented and serrated nature reminded him of a carpenter's saw.

The Cape Banks Lighthouse has been listed as a state heritage place on the South Australian Heritage Register.

On 31 October 1996, boundaries were created for the locality which was given the "long established name."

Areas of interest
The town is a gateway to the Canunda National Park and Lake Bonney SE. Carpenter Rocks supports a significant southern rock lobster industry and Bucks Bay provides a safe haven for the many fishing boats moored there.

See also
 Bucks Lake Game Reserve
 Carpenter Rocks Conservation Park
 Cape Banks Lighthouse

References

External links
 District Council of Grant - Carpenters Rocks page
 Limestone Coast Tourism
 SS Admella 150th Anniversary 2009

Coastal towns in South Australia
Limestone Coast
Fishing communities in Australia